Falling Up was an American Christian rock band from Albany, Oregon. Falling Up formed in October 2001, and released their debut album Crashings in 2004. They were signed to BEC Recordings in 2003 after a recommendation from friends in the band Kutless. The band's name came from the first song they wrote, which talked about their belief in both human imperfection and in the grace of God which compensates for that imperfection; their lyrics were heavily grace-themed. 

Over time, the lyrics became more abstract and poetic as the band's style shifted from alternative rock to a more experimental direction, and they started creating more diverse music.

The band went through several line-up changes, with only lead vocalist Jessy Ribordy, bassist Jeremy Miller, and drummer Josh Shroy appearing on every album. They became an independent band with the release of Your Sparkling Death Cometh in 2011, and remained as such until the release of their final self-titled album.

History

Crashings and Dawn Escapes (2004–06)
Falling Up debuted on February 24, 2004, with their 12-track album, Crashings. Produced by Aaron Sprinkle. Crashings sold 3,396 units in its first week, which exceeded first-week sales of any other album in the history of BEC Recordings—displacing the previous record held by Kutless, who were childhood friends of Falling Up. Crashings sold over 50,000 units by the end of 2004. Three songs from Crashings—"Broken Heart," "Escalates," and "Bittersweet"—all reached No. 1 on the Christian rock charts at R&R.

Their second album, Dawn Escapes, was released on October 25, 2005 through BEC Recordings. Produced by Michael "Elvis" Baskette (Chevelle, Cold), the album, though more melodic and hard rock-driven as a whole, did not majorly deviate from the sound of Crashings. Dawn Escapes pushed Falling Up's lifetime record sales to over 150,000 by the summer of 2006. Guitarist Tom Cox left the band shortly before the album's release, eventually going on to form his own band, Archers Rise, whose debut release was produced by Ribordy. He was replaced by guitarist Micah Sannan.

On September 12, 2006, Falling Up released Exit Lights, an album featuring remixes of the band's biggest hits and the new song "Islander." Solomon Olds of Family Force 5, Thousand Foot Krutch's Trevor McNevan, and Randy Torres of Project 86 fame were among the artists who worked with Falling Up for the project. Guitarist Joseph Kisselburgh left the band in May 2006 to focus on his solo project, The Send, which released its debut album on Tooth & Nail Records in July 2007. The band enlisted a number of touring guitarists (including Hawk Nelson's Jonathan Steingard) to fill in for Kisselburgh during summer tour dates, although no permanent replacement was ever sought, with the group remaining a five-piece afterwards.

Captiva and Fangs! (2007–09)
The band announced the release date for their next project, code-named "Abandoners," on their Myspace page. Later on, they would announce the release name Captiva.  The album was released on October 2, 2007. The first single from the album was "Hotel Aquarium," followed by "Goodnight Gravity," "How They Made Cameras," "Maps," and "A Guide to Marine Life." The band also filmed a music video for "Hotel Aquarium," which was featured in X 2008. After recording but before the release of the album, guitarist Micah Sannan departed Falling Up and joined the Christian hard rock band Disciple. Keyboardist Adam Taylor also departed around the same time to manage merchandise for Christian rock band Hawk Nelson. Daniel Elder soon joined the band as their new guitar player, reducing the band to a quartet.

Falling Up's fourth studio album, Fangs, was released March 24, 2009. According to their MySpace page, Fangs was to be their "heaviest album yet", something which was often disputed in the post-release period. It was also said that the album would be "more of an arrangement than just a record that is put together randomly", as well as that it "[would] not have 14 great songs in entirety, but just intriguing moments and sections." One of the song titles, "Lotus and Languorous" was released early.

According to BEC Recordings and Falling Up's Myspace, Falling Up headlined the Fangs! tour in late April early May 2009 with Tooth and Nail artist Ruth and Portland indie/rock artist Archeology. Unlike past tours, the venues on this tour were strictly secular.

Side projects and hiatus (2009–10)
After the release of Fangs!, band members Jessy Ribordy and Josh Shroy started a side project under the name The River Empires, who created an album "Epilogue" with the help of The Dear Hunter's Casey Crescenzo, as well as a handful of other musicians. Jessy Ribordy also began working on a solo project, The Gloomcatcher, releasing its first album, Slow Chorale. The debut albums from both projects were released on April 6, 2010.

On January 20, 2010 lead vocalist Jessy Ribordy announced that Falling Up was "taking a permanent break", and their final show would be held at the Parachute Music Festival on January 29.

Independent reunion and Your Sparkling Death Cometh (2010–12)
On October 22, 2010, the band updated their MySpace page with information that new music was "in the works." The website FallingUpLives.com was then launched, followed by a Kickstarter campaign. Jessy explained on the website that the reason for the breakup was due to the band members wanting to explore other musical endeavors and the fact the BEC did not support the band's ideas for future releases. Jessy also stated that the band members did not feel comfortable about ending Falling Up so abruptly, leading to their decision to return making music, independently this time. 

On January 21, 2011, Falling Up's Kickstarter campaign for their new album ended, having raised $13,665, more than their goal of $10,000. Rewards for the campaign included an exclusive download of two of Falling Up's demo songs, "Phantasm" and "Monster Blood," both of which were tracks cut from their "Captiva" album, an exclusive T-shirt, signed copies of the new record, and cover songs performed by the band. The new record began recording on February 9, 2011, with Jessy Ribordy saying that the album would be released in June of 2011. On March 18, 2011, the band's website was updated with a logo displaying Your Sparkling Death Cometh, and a release date of June 2011. Shortly after, the band confirmed on their Facebook page that "Your Sparkling Death Cometh" would be the title of the upcoming album. 

On May 25, 2011, Falling Up released the first single for Your Sparkling Death Cometh, Blue Ghost, on their ReverbNation page. On June 1, 2011, Falling Up released the second single, Diamnds also on their ReverbNation page. The two singles were generally well-received, with "Diamnds" being in the Top 20 most requested songs on ChristianRock.net during its first week. Although not officially released until June 28, Your Sparkling Death Cometh reportedly arrived to those who had pre-ordered the album as early as June 23. WhenYour Sparkling Death Cometh was released on June 28, 2011, the album generally received very favorable reviews from critics. It was cited as being exceptionally creative, with a strong focus on originality and composure. Jesus Freak Hideout gave the album five out of five possible stars, as did New Release Tuesday. CM Addict gave it a slightly lower score of 8.5/10, citing that a couple of tracks "are just so-so."

The same day as Your Sparkling Death Comeths release, Falling Up updated their website to fit with the theme of the album. A player was also added, allowing each track from Your Sparkling Death Cometh to be played in its entirety. Prior to the album's release, it was stated several times by the band members that this would likely be Falling Up's last project, but that this may be dependent on the reception of the upcoming album. With the album's release, they added a biography section to their website which implied that they were hoping to continue Falling Up, even 10 years after its inception.

Following the release of Your Sparkling Death Cometh, Falling Up played their first live show since the Fangs! tour three years prior at the Hawthorne Theatre in Portland, Oregon on January 7, 2012. Ruth and Water & Bodies were the opening acts for the band.

Falling Up announced in early January 2012 that a remix EP was in the works, and also said that they were hoping to have some new music released by the end of the year. On April 11, 2012, the band released Mnemos, their first remix album since Exit Lights.

Mnemos contained seven tracks on its own, and there were also three bonus tracks added when the album reached 1,000 downloads. The tracks found on the album were not full remixes, but repetitions of hooks found in the various sections of Your Sparkling Death Cometh. At the time of Mnemos' release, Falling Up was only able to remix songs from Your Sparkling Death Cometh, due to BEC holding the rights to their previous songs.

The Mnemos EP was released on Groupees through the "Feed Them with Music" program, a charity which provides a meal for a needy family for every download. All of Falling Up's profits from the EP were donated to this program. Within the first 24 hours of the album's release there were over 1,500 downloads.

Machine De Ella, Falling Up, and Reimagined (2012–2017)
Falling Up's next project was teased as The Machine De Ella project. The project was eventually revealed to consist of two albums, Hours and Midnight on Earthship, as well as an audio book, also titled Hours, written by Jessy Ribordy. The idea for the project came when the band considered their two different fanbases. Hours was recorded as a concept album based on the book within the project, and was more rock-driven. Midnight on Earthship was recorded with a sound and lyrics more along the lines of their Christian roots, with its songs being more faith-based. Both of the albums and the book began their launch on October 9, 2012, and were progressively released over the course of three months.

In August 2014, Falling Up initiated a Kickstarter fundraiser for their tenth full-length album that raised over $48,000, exceeding the $40,000 goal. During the Kickstarter campaign, Falling Up announced that this would be the band's final album. On November 13, 2015, Falling Up released their final studio album, the self-titled Falling Up to critical acclaim.

On June 10, 2016, Falling Up released a two-song EP titled Reimagined to follow through on a reward tier from their Kickstarter campaign. It consisted of two recreated songs, "Broken Heart" and "Arafax Deep", which originally debuted on the band's first album, Crashings. In early 2017, the band released their final song, a reimagined cover of Brand New's "Gasoline."

Members 

Final lineup
 Jessy Ribordy – lead vocals, guitars, keyboards, programming (2001–2015)
 Jeremy Miller – bass guitar, keyboards (2001–2015)
 Josh Shroy – drums, percussion (2001–2015)
 Daniel Elder – guitar, backing vocals (2008–2015)
 Nick Lambert – guitar (2009–2015)

Former
 Tom Cox – guitar, backing vocals (2001–2005)
 Joe Kisselburgh – guitar, backing vocals (2001–2006)
 Andrew Wadlow – turntables, keyboards, programming (2001–2003)
 Michael Humphrey – turntables, keyboards, programming (2003–2005)
 Micah Sannan – guitar (2005–2007)
 Adam Taylor – keyboards, programming, backing vocals (2005–2007)

Touring musicians
 Daniel Huddleston – lead guitar (2007–2010)

Discography 

 Crashings (2004, BEC)
 Dawn Escapes (2005, BEC)
 Exit Lights (2006, BEC)
 Captiva (2007, BEC)
 Discover the Trees Again: The Best of Falling Up (2008, BEC)
 Fangs! (2009, BEC)
 Your Sparkling Death Cometh (2011, independent)
 Mnemos EP (2012, independent)
 Hours (2013, independent)
 Midnight on Earthship (2013, independent)
 Silver City (2013, independent)
 House Full of Caverns (2015, independent)
 Falling Up (2015, independent)

See also 
List of ambient music artists

References

External links 

 

American Christian rock groups
Rock music groups from Oregon
American post-grunge musical groups
Culture of Albany, Oregon
Heavy metal musical groups from Oregon
Musical groups established in 2001
2001 establishments in Oregon